Basom is a hamlet in Genesee County, New York, United States. Basom has a post office with ZIP code 14013, which opened on August 22, 1889.

References

Hamlets in Genesee County, New York
Hamlets in New York (state)